Bogdan Milić (born 24 November 1987) is a Montenegrin footballer who plays as a striker for Mladost Donja Gorica in the Montenegrin Second League.

Club career
Born in Titograd, Milić was a FK Mladost Podgorica youth graduate, but made his senior debuts with FK Budućnost Podgorica, aged only 17. After scoring nine goals during the 2007–08 campaign, he moved to Eredivisie club ADO Den Haag. He is part of the Kuči clan.

A big striker, Milić made his Eredivisie debut on 31 August 2008, coming on as a late substitute for Leroy Resodihardjo in a 5–2 away win against Sparta Rotterdam. He scored his first goal for the club roughly a year later, netting the first in a 3–1 win at Vitesse Arnhem.

In June 2010 Milić signed for FC Krylia Sovetov Samara, after impressing on a trial. In August, however, he was released, after being deemed surplus to requirements by new manager's Yuri Gazzaev, and subsequently joined FC Viktoria Plzeň.

In March 2011 Milić moved to PFC Spartak Nalchik, after appearing rarely with Viktoria. After a two-year spell in South Korea with Gwangju FC and Suwon FC he returned to his native country, signing for FK Rudar Pljevlja.

In the 2014 summer Milić returned to his first club Mladost Podgorica, netting a career-best 12 goals during the season. With Mladost he won 2014/2015 Montenegrin Cup. On 30 July 2015 he joined Spanish Segunda División side CA Osasuna.

In a debut for Terengganu F.A Milic scored first goal against Melaka F.A in Malaysia Cup group stage, but their team lost to Melaka F.A 2-1

References

External links
Profile at Voetbal International

1987 births
Footballers from Podgorica
Living people
Association football forwards
Serbia and Montenegro footballers
Montenegrin footballers
Montenegro under-21 international footballers

FK Budućnost Podgorica players
ADO Den Haag players
PFC Krylia Sovetov Samara players
FC Viktoria Plzeň players
PFC Spartak Nalchik players
Gwangju FC players
Suwon FC players
FK Rudar Pljevlja players
OFK Titograd players
CA Osasuna players
Terengganu FC players
Saipa F.C. players
FK Iskra Danilovgrad players
FK Andijon players
Montenegrin First League players
Eredivisie players
Czech First League players
Russian Premier League players
K League 1 players
K League 2 players
Segunda División players
Malaysia Super League players
Persian Gulf Pro League players
Montenegrin Second League players
Uzbekistan Super League players
Montenegrin expatriate footballers
Expatriate footballers in the Netherlands
Montenegrin expatriate sportspeople in the Netherlands
Expatriate footballers in Russia
Montenegrin expatriate sportspeople in Russia
Expatriate footballers in the Czech Republic
Montenegrin expatriate sportspeople in the Czech Republic
Expatriate footballers in South Korea
Montenegrin expatriate sportspeople in South Korea
Expatriate footballers in Spain
Montenegrin expatriate sportspeople in Spain
Expatriate footballers in Malaysia
Montenegrin expatriate sportspeople in Malaysia
Expatriate footballers in Iran
Montenegrin expatriate sportspeople in Iran
Expatriate footballers in Uzbekistan
Montenegrin expatriate sportspeople in Uzbekistan